Rissone is a surname. Notable people with the surname include:

 Giuditta Rissone (1895–1977), Italian film actress
 Checco Rissone (1909–1985), Italian actor
 Francesco Rissone (1900-1987), Italian American mobster

Italian-language surnames